Myongji University is a private, Christian university founded in 1948 in South Korea. It provides higher education in the fields of engineering, sciences and humanities. It is made up of 10 colleges, 42 departments, seven faculties and eight specialized postgraduate programs.

Myongji University has been a center for practical humanism over the past half century, and is operating various and practical globalization programs while having exchange with 150 universities in 22 countries.

History
Myongji University set off as Seoul Primary College of Home Economics, established by Moo-gung Institution in 1948 and in 1953, established Geunhwa Women's Primary College. In 1955, its name was changed to Seoul's Primary Women's College. In 1956, it was reorganized as a coeducation school, Seoul College of Education of Liberal Arts and Science. Then, Christian founding spirit and education policy was set up. According to timely demand of reinforcement of vocational training, its name was changed again to Seoul Practical College of Liberal Arts and Science in 1962.

The school's name was changed from Moo-gung Institution to Myongji Institution based on Christian faith. After the inauguration of President Sang-geun You in 1964, its name changed to Myongji University. After being approved as a 4-year University, school planned and designed the 10 Developmental Programs including building new lecture halls, making and reorganizing departments, establishing graduate schools, etc.

Memorial Arch status raised to university on September 8, 1983, and made departments of politics and home economics, modified department quota. By active support of Myongji Institute, Yongin Campus was built and made growth such as founding of affiliated facility, Extension University dividing natural and social science campus in two different campuses.

On September 13, 1994, the Arts and Design Center was built in industry-academia cooperation of Myongji University and Nasan Group. Myongji University had a New Millennium Proclamation Ceremony to make creative epistemic community that will lead 21st century's Korea and to cope with rapidly changing university environment. It is also taking off to be a university living Christian faith, creativity, innovation, action and a university that becomes power of future society.

Symbol and mascot 
The leafed tree symbolizes the founding spirit of the Myong Ji Educational Foundation to imbue the students with the Christian faith, so that they may become devoted and capable leaders who can contribute to the advancement of our culture and national prosperity and ultimately to the realization of world peace.

The white stallion is a symbol of loyalty, courage, obedience, and purity. It is also a reference to the equestrian origins of the Korean people. The school mascot is, therefore, a representation of the profound hope that Myongjians, like the white stallion, will be steeped in such virtues as loyalty, courage, obedience, and purity as they gallop into the world for the realization of God's kingdom here on earth.

Organization

Undergraduate 

College of Humanities
Korean Language and Literature 
History 
Library & Information Science 
Japanese Language and Literature 
Creative Writing 
Arabic Studies 
Art History 
Chinese Language and Literature 
English Language and Literature 
Philosophy
College of Social Science
Public Administration 
Digital Media 
North Korean Studies 
Political Science and Diplomacy 
Youth Education and Leadership 
Child Development and Education 
Economics 
Department of Social Welfare
College of Business Administration
Business Administration 
International Business and Trade 
Real Estate 
Management Information
College of Engineering 
Electrical Engineering 
Civil and Environmental Engineering 
Chemical Engineering 
Industrial and Management Engineering 
Computer Engineering 
Communication Engineering 
Mechanical Engineering 
Environmental Engineering and Biotechnology 
Electronics Engineering 
Transportation Engineering 
Materials Science & Engineering
College of Natural Science
Mathematics 
Division of Biosciences and Bioinformatics 
Food and Nutrition 
Chemistry 
Physics
College of Arts and Physical Education
Division of Design 
Division of Film and Musical (formerly, Division of Culture and Arts)
Baduk Studies 
Division of Music 
Division of Physical Education, Sport and Leisure Studies
College of Architecture
Division of Architecture 
Space Design
Bangmok College of General Education
Division of general education in social science campus
Division of Open Major in Social Sciences 
Division of general education in natural science campus 
Division of Open Major in Natural Sciences 
Department of Teacher Training

Baduk studies 
The Department of Baduk studies was established in 1997, for the first time in world history, to pursue an academic study of baduk. The Department of Baduk Studies has been set up with the following aims:

 To promote students' game strength above the 5 dan level 
 To acquire a deeper knowledge of life from Baduk culture 
 To develop and educate the leaders in the field of baduk 
 To teach necessary foreign languages to those who can introduce baduk culture to the world

The department teaches baduk theory and technique systematically, researches baduk culture in depth, and acquires wide knowledge related to the game. The graduates will make proper baduk leaders in Korea and foreign countries.

The area of the Baduk Studies is divided into the nature of baduk, technical theory, practical matches, related fields, baduk education, and professional administration, to name a few.

In 1997, Baduk Instruction Studies was established in the College of Arts and Physical Education as a course. In 1998 it was promoted as an independent department in the College of Arts and Physical Science, The enrollment quota was increased to 30, in 1999. In 2000 the first Bachelor of Arts in Baduk Studies appeared and in 2001 the Graduate School of Baduk Studies was opened. By 2003 the first Master of Arts in Baduk Studies appeared.

Graduate school 
College of Law
Graduate School of Education
Graduate School of Archival Sciences 
Graduate School of Social Education
Graduate School of Social Welfare 
Graduate School of Industrial Technology 
Graduate School of Distribution & Logistics 
Graduate School of Business and Economics in Information 
Graduate School of Investment Information

International Graduate School 
The programs are offered in English (however, the website is only available in Korean):

 Engineering design and management (specialization in electronics and communications engineering, mechanical and automobile engineering, environmental engineering, computer engineering and software)
 Intercultural studies

Academic profile

Admission 
Applications are invited for undergraduate and graduate programs twice a year. For fall semester starting in the end of August applications are open from October 1 to November 30. For spring semester starting in the end of February applications are open from April 1 to May 31.

Scholarships 
For graduate studies, Myongji University Professors offer scholarship from research funds, TAship, RAship or support through Korean government scholarships like IITA-English IITA-Main or KRF. Other scholarships are also provided by university at graduate and undergraduate levels.

Research laboratories 
Myongji University maintains a large number of research laboratories for areas such as computing, engineering, and biosciences.

Notable alumni

Linguistics
Seong Baek-in (1968–1982), scholar of the Manchu language

Politics
Song Ja, politician and academic

Sports

Park Ji-sung, retired footballer, former South Korean national team captain and midfielder for Manchester United
Ahn Seon-tae, retired footballer
Cho Hyung-ik, footballer for Daegu FC
Chu Jung-hyun, footballer for Mokpo City FC
Han Tae-you, footballer
Jeon Kwang-jin, footballer
Kim Bong-rae, footballer for Jeju United
Kim Jung-hyuk, retired footballer
Kim Kyung-rae, retired footballer
Kim Min-kyun, footballer for FC Anyang
Koo Bon-sang, footballer for FC Anyang
Moon Byung-woo, footballer for Daejeon Korail FC
Na Kwang-hyun, footballer
Park Jae-hong, footballer
Jung Dae-young, volleyball player for Gimcheon Korea Expressway Corporation Hi-Pass

Music

 Lee Taemin (SHINee)
 Key (SHINee)
 Kim Jong-hyun (SHINee)
 Kim Junsu (TVXQ and JYJ)
 Kim Kwang-seok
 Byun Baek-hyun (EXO)
 Jeon Boram (T-ara)
 Kim Ye-won (Jewelry)
 Kim Yu-bin (Wonder Girls)
 Lee Donghae (Super Junior)
 Lee Moon-se
 Lee Sung-min (Super Junior)
 Qri (T-ara)
 Sim Soo-bong
 Teddy Park
 Yoon Bo-ra (Sistar)
 Yunho (TVXQ)
 Sandeul (B1A4)
 Yoon Ji-sung (Wanna One)
 Lina (The Grace and Isak N Jiyeon)
 Nayun (Momoland)
 Seo You Kyung (AOA Black, Sponge★Band and P.AZIT)
 Donghyun/Kim Dong-hyun (Boyfriend)
 Eunji (Brave Girls)
 Yooseung (M.Pire)
 Yeoeun (Melody Day)
 Yujeong (LABOUM)
 Minjae (SONAMOO)

Theater, film and television

Ahn Yong-joon
Baek Il-seob
Bong Tae-gyu
Ji Jin-hee
Jin Ye-sol
Jo Dong-hyuk
Jo Hyun-jae
Kim Nam-gil
Jeon Mi-do
Park Bo-gum
Ryu Soo-young
Yeon Jung-hoon

References

External links 
 Official page in Korean
 Official page in English
 International Graduate School
 Myongji Colleges

 
Universities and colleges in Seoul
Educational institutions established in 1948
Go organizations
1948 establishments in Korea
Seodaemun District
Private universities and colleges in South Korea